Mikal Andreassen Stenberg (8 August 1849 – 19 February 1941) was a Norwegian merchant and politician for the Conservative Party.

He was born in Lund as a son of farmers. He became a tailor from 1864 and a merchant from 1895, settling in Stavanger. Here he was elected city council member from 1885 to 1906, serving as deputy mayor from 1901 to 1903. He was elected as a deputy representative to the Parliament of Norway for the terms 1895–1897 and 1904–1906, meeting in parliamentary session in 1906.

References

1849 births
1941 deaths
Politicians from Stavanger
Deputy members of the Storting
Conservative Party (Norway) politicians